The International School @ ParkCity (ISP) is an international school catering for students age 3–18, located in the award-winning residential area of Desa ParkCity in Kuala Lumpur, Malaysia. The school was established by a partnership between Brighton Education Group Sdn Bhd, who provide educational services in ASEAN, and Perdana ParkCity Sdn Bhd who operates this and other townships. It opened in September 2011.

Accreditations and awards 
For external examinations the school is accredited by Cambridge Assessment International Education and Assessment and Qualifications Alliance (AQA).

It is a member of the Association of International Malaysian Schools (AIMS), and the Federation of British International Schools in Asia (FOBISIA).

In 2016 and 2018 it was selected by Apple as an Apple Distinguished School, an award that recognises the school as "an exemplary learning environment for innovation, leadership, and educational excellence".

Following an accreditation inspection in 2017 by the International School Quality Mark (ISQM), ISP was awarded Gold Accreditation, gaining an ‘Outstanding’ grade of every category.

ISP is an Award Centre for the Duke of Edinburgh's International Award (DOE-IA).

References

External links

 
 Desa ParkCity

British international schools in Malaysia
International schools in Kuala Lumpur
Secondary schools in Kuala Lumpur
Cambridge schools in Malaysia
Educational institutions established in 2011
2011 establishments in Malaysia
Malaysia–United Kingdom relations